The 2020–21 Michigan Stars FC season was the club's second season playing in the third division National Independent Soccer Association and first full professional season.

Club

Roster 
As of April 19, 2021.

Coaching staff

Transfers

Transfers In

Transfers Out

Friendlies

Competitions

NISA Fall season

On June 4, NISA announced the initial details for the 2020 Fall Season with the member teams split into conferences, Eastern and Western.

Details for the Fall regular season were announced on July 31, 2020. The Stars will take part as a member of the Eastern Conference.

Standings

Results summary

Matches

Fall Playoffs

All eight NISA teams qualified for the 2020 Fall tournament, which will be hosted at Keyworth Stadium in Detroit, Michigan, beginning on September 21 ending with the final on October 2.

Group stage

2021 Spring Season

NISA Legends Cup 
NISA announced initial spring season plans in early February 2021, including starting the season with a tournament in Chattanooga, Tennessee with a standard regular season to follow. The tournament, now called the NISA Legends Cup, was officially announced on March 10 and is scheduled to run between April 13 and 25. All nine NISA members teams taking part in the Spring were divided into three team groups and played a round robin schedule. The highest placing group winner automatically qualified for the tournament final, while the second and third highest finishing teams overall played one-another in a semifinal to determine a second finalist.

The Stars were drawn into Group 1 alongside the debuting Maryland Bobcats FC and the returning San Diego 1904 FC.

Standings

Group 1 results

Matches

Regular season 
The Spring Season schedule was announced on March 18 with each association member playing eight games, four home and four away, in a single round-robin format.

Standings

Results summary

Matches

U.S. Open Cup 

As a team playing in a recognized professional league, Michigan would normally be automatically qualified for the U.S. Open Cup. However, with the 2021 edition shorted due to the COVID-19 pandemic, NISA has only been allotted 1 to 2 teams spots. On March 29, U.S. Soccer announced 2020 Fall Champion Detroit City FC as NISA's representative in the tournament.

Squad statistics

Appearances and goals 

|-
! colspan="16" style="background:#dcdcdc; text-align:center"| Goalkeepers

|-
! colspan="16" style="background:#dcdcdc; text-align:center"| Defenders

|-
! colspan="16" style="background:#dcdcdc; text-align:center"| Midfielders

|-
! colspan="16" style="background:#dcdcdc; text-align:center"| Forwards

|-
! colspan="16" style="background:#dcdcdc; text-align:center"| Left during season

|-
|}

Goal scorers

Disciplinary record

See also
 2020–21 NISA season

References

Michigan Stars FC
Michigan Stars FC
Michigan Stars FC
Michigan Stars FC